Viran Morros de Argila (born 15 December 1983) is a Spanish handball player for Pfadi Winterthur and the Spain national team.

He participated at the 2019 World Men's Handball Championship.

Individual awards
Best Defence Player of the European Championship: 2012

References

External links

1983 births
Living people
Spanish male handball players
Liga ASOBAL players
FC Barcelona Handbol players
BM Ciudad Real players
CB Ademar León players
Handball players at the 2012 Summer Olympics
Sportspeople from Barcelona
Olympic handball players of Spain
Handball players from Catalonia
Expatriate handball players
Spanish expatriate sportspeople in France
Handball-Bundesliga players
Handball players at the 2020 Summer Olympics
Medalists at the 2020 Summer Olympics
Olympic bronze medalists for Spain
Olympic medalists in handball